Dejan Radonjić (born February 2, 1970) is a Montenegrin professional basketball coach and former player who last served as the head coach for Panathinaikos of the Greek Basket League and the EuroLeague.

He won three YUBA League championships and a Yugoslav Cup with Budućnost. He retired as a player with NIS Vojvodina in 2004. 

Radonjić became the head coach for Budućnost in 2005. Until 2012, he won seven consecutive Montenegrin League championships and six consecutive Montenegrin Cup tournaments with Budućnost. In 2013, Radonjić joined Serbian team Crvena zvezda. Until 2017, he won both the Adriatic League and Serbian League championships the same 3-in-a-row sequence, as well as three Serbian Cup tournaments. Thereafter, he coached German team Bayern Munich in three seasons, winning two German League championships. In 2021, he returned to Crvena Zvezda.

Playing career 
A point guard, Radonjić played 14 seasons in the YUBA League system between 1990 and 2004. During his playing days, he played for Lovćen, Budućnost, Profikolor, FMP Železnik, and NIS Vojvodina. During his second stint with Budućnost (1998–2002), he won three National championships and a Yugoslav Cup. He retired as a player with NIS Vojvodina in 2004.

Coaching career

Budućnost (2005–2013) 
Radonjić began his coaching career back in 2005 at well-known Montenegrin team Budućnost. With them he won seven consecutive Montenegrin League championships, as well as six Montenegrin Cups.

Crvena zvezda (2013–2017) 
In April 2013, following the departure of Vlada Vukoičić, he became the head coach of the Serbian team Crvena zvezda. On 30 June 2015, he signed a two-year extension with Crvena zvezda.

Bayern Munich (2018–2020) 
On 2 April 2018, Radonjić was named the head coach of the German team Bayern Munich, after dismissal of Aleksandar Đorđević. On 7 January 2020, Bayern Munich released head coach Radonjić.

Crvena zvezda (2020–2022) 
On 25 December 2020, Radonjić became the head coach of Crvena zvezda for the second time. On 14 February 2021, Radonjić won its fourth Serbian Cup title following a 73–60 win over Mega Soccerbet in the Final.

On 19 February 2022, Radonjić won his 300th game for Crvena zvezda, in a 72–53 win over Mega Mozzart.

Panathinaikos (2022–2023) 
On June 30, 2022, Radonjić signed a two-year deal with Panathinaikos of the Greek Basket League and the EuroLeague.After poor performance, results and failing to advance in Euroleague play-offs for third year in row, on February 21st Randojic was fired from Panathinaikos.

National team coaching career 
In 2011, Radonjić had a short stint as the head coach of the Montenegrin national basketball team.

Career achievements and awards
 Player
 Yugoslav League champion: 3  (with Budućnost: 1998–99, 1999–00, 2000–01)
 Yugoslav Cup winner: 1  (with Budućnost: 2000–01)

 Coach
 ABA League champion: 5  (with Crvena zvezda: 2014–15, 2015–16, 2016–17, 2020–21, 2021–22)
 German League champion: 2 (with Bayern Munich: 2017–18, 2018–19)
 Serbian League champion: 5  (with Crvena zvezda: 2014–15, 2015–16, 2016–17, 2020–21, 2021–22)
 Montenegrin League champion: 6  (with Budućnost: 2006–07, 2007–08, 2008–09, 2009–10, 2010–11, 2011–12)
 Serbian Cup winner: 5  (with Crvena zvezda: 2013–14, 2014–15, 2016–17, 2020–21, 2021–22)
 Montenegrin Cup winner: 6  (with Budućnost: 2006–07, 2007–08, 2008–09, 2009–10, 2010–11, 2011–12)

Coaching record

EuroLeague

|- 
| align="left" rowspan=4|Crvena zvezda
| align="left" |2013–14
| 10 || 4 || 6 ||  || align="center"|Eliminated in the group stage
|- 
| align="left" |2014–15
| 24 || 10 || 14 ||  || align="center"|Eliminated in Top 16 stage
|- 
| align="left" |2015–16
| 27 || 12 || 15 ||  || align="center"|Eliminated in Quarterfinal Playoffs
|- 
| align="left" |2016–17
| 30 || 16 || 14 ||  || align="center"|Eliminated in the regular season
|- 
| align="left" rowspan=2|Bayern Munich
| align="left" |2018–19
| 30 || 14 || 16 ||  || align="center"|Eliminated in the regular season
|- 
| align="left" |2019–20
| 17 || 6 || 11 ||  || align="center"|Sacked
|- 
| align="left" rowspan=2| Crvena zvezda
| align="left" |2020–21
| 18 || 5 || 13 ||  || align="center"|Eliminated in the regular season
|- 
| align="left" |2021–22
| 33 || 14 || 19 ||  || align="center"|Eliminated in the regular season
|- 
| align="left" |Panathinaikos
| align="left" |2022–23
| 24 || 8 || 16 ||  || align="center"|Sacked
|-class="sortbottom"
| align="center" colspan=2|Career||213||89||124||||

Adriatic League

Personal life 
His son Petar is a basketball coach.

See also 

 List of ABA League-winning coaches
 List of KK Crvena zvezda head coaches
 List of Serbian League-winning coaches
 List of Radivoj Korać Cup-winning head coaches

References

External links
 Dejan Radonjić at euroleague.net (as a player)
 Dejan Radonjić at euroleague.net (as a coach)
 Dejan Radonjić at fibaeurope.com
 Dejan Radonjić at kkcrvenazvezda.rs

1970 births
Living people
ABA League-winning coaches
FC Bayern Munich basketball coaches
KK Budućnost coaches
KK Budućnost players
KK Crvena zvezda head coaches
KK FMP (1991–2011) players
KK Lovćen players
KK Profikolor players
KK Vojvodina Srbijagas players
Montenegrin basketball coaches
Montenegrin expatriate basketball people in Germany
Montenegrin expatriate basketball people in Greece
Montenegrin expatriate basketball people in Serbia
Montenegrin men's basketball players
Panathinaikos B.C. coaches
Point guards
Sportspeople from Podgorica